Philip David Wickham (born April 5, 1984) is a Contemporary Christian musician, singer and songwriter from San Diego, California. Wickham has released nine albums: Give You My World in 2003, a self-titled album in 2006, Cannons in 2007, Singalong in 2008, Heaven & Earth in 2009, Response in 2011, Singalong 2 in 2012, The Ascension in 2013, Sing-A-Long 3 in 2015, Children of God in 2016, Living Hope in 2018, and Hymn Of Heaven in 2021. He has also led worship at Soul Survivor. His critically acclaimed single "This is Amazing Grace" became RIAA certified Platinum and topped the 2014 year-end Christian Airplay chart.

Biography

Wickham was raised in a Christian home, the second of three children (brother Evan, sister Jillian), and began leading worship for his youth group at 13 years old. In 2002, he graduated from Calvary Christian School in Vista, California. As of this date, Wickham's father, John Wickham is a musician and a worship leader, and both of his parents were members of Jesus movement band Parable at one time. His older brother, Evan Wickham, is also a musician, who used to serve at Calvary Chapel in Vista, and later became pastor of Park Hill Church in San Diego, California. His parents, John and Lisa (née Irwin), encouraged Wickham to learn popular praise songs and to write his own.

Wickham attends Harvest Christian Fellowship and his pastor is Greg Laurie.

Career

Albums
Wickham began a full-time music career by touring California and recording his first album, Give You My World, in 2003; after that release, Wickham signed with Simple Records. Wickham released his self-titled label debut in 2006. Wickham's second release with Simple/INO Records, Cannons, was released in 2007.  Cannons was partly inspired by cannon explosions and C. S. Lewis' book The Voyage of the Dawn Treader from The Chronicles of Narnia series. Wickham stated in an interview with ChristianityToday.com that the album is "about how the universe is exploding with the glory of God, and how we are compelled to join in with its song." The 10th track from Cannons, "Jesus Lord of Heaven", has been translated into seven different languages. On August 8, 2008, Wickham released a live worship album, Singalong, recorded at Solid Rock Church in Portland, Oregon, with 3,000 present. The album was released as a free download, only available from his website, and received over 8,000 downloads within a week of being released. After the release of Singalong, his self-titled album hit No. 25 on iTunes Store Top Christian Albums sales, two years after its initial release.

Heaven & Earth, Wickham's third studio album, was released on November 17, 2009. Wickham's Christmas album Songs for Christmas was released as a digital download available on his website on October 29, 2010. Wickham's fourth full-length studio album, Response, was released on October 4, 2011. On October 30, 2012, Phil Wickham released his second live acoustic album, Singalong 2. The Ascension, Wickham's fifth studio album, was released on September 24, 2013. The album peaked at No. 39 on the Billboard 200, making it Wickham's highest charting album on the chart. The lead single off of this album, "This is Amazing Grace", became No. 1 on the 2014 year-end Christian Airplay Songs chart.

In February 2016, Wickham released the first single, "Your Love Awakens Me", from his album, Children of God, which was released later that year. Living Hope, Wickham's seventh full-length studio project, was released in August 2018. The album debuted at No. 1 on the Billboard Christian Albums chart, his first album to do so. On Oct 4, 2019, Wickham's 10-track holiday album, Christmas, was released along with the music video for "Joy To The World (Joyful, Joyful)". Wickham toured both Texas and California with Shane & Shane that same December on their annual Christmas tour. Christmas would go on to spend 12 weeks on the Billboard Christian Albums chart, peaking at No. 24.

June 2021 saw the release of the artist's eighth studio album, the critically acclaimed and award-winning Hymn of Heaven. Featuring a guest appearance by Brandon Lake, its releases included "Battle Belongs" (No. 2 on the Hot Christian Songs chart), "House of the Lord" (No. 1) and "Hymn of Heaven" (No. 2), along with It's Always Been You released as a promotional single. Debuting at No. 1 on Billboards Top Christian Albums Chart in the United States, it also entered at No. 6 on the Official Charts' Official Christian & Gospel Albums Chart in the United Kingdom. At the 2021 GMA Dove Awards, "Battle Belongs" was nominated for the GMA Dove Award for Worship Recorded Song of the Year. The album was nominated for the Billboard Music Award for Top Christian Album at the 2022 Billboard Music Awards. At the 2022 GMA Dove Awards, Hymn of Heaven won the GMA Dove Award for Worship Album of the Year, the title track won the GMA Dove Award for Worship Recorded Song of the Year, and "House of the Lord" was nominated for two GMA Dove Awards: Song of the Year and Pop/Contemporary Song of the Year.

Tours
Wickham visits churches across the world to play his music. From late 2006 to early 2007, he went on the "Coming Up to Breathe" tour with MercyMe and Audio Adrenaline. In late 2007, he went on the Remedy tour with the David Crowder Band and The Myriad.

Other activities
In the mid-2010s, Wickham was one of the worship leaders present at Soul Survivor week C and Momentum Festival in the UK.

Discography

Filmography

Awards and nominations

American Music Awards

|-
| 2022
| Phil Wickham
| Favorite Inspirational Artist
| 
|-
|}

Billboard Music Awards

|-
| 2022
| Hymn of Heaven
| Top Christian Album
| 
|-
|}

GMA Dove Awards

Grammy Awards

Personal life
Wickham had surgery to remove a polyp from folds of his vocal cords on April 28, 2014, after which he was prescribed a month of silence to allow the surgical site to heal. He was uncertain that he would be able to sing again, leading to identity issues and self-doubt. His spiritual revelation during these times was the basis for his 2016 album Children of God.

Further reading

Notes

References

External links
 Official website

1984 births
Living people
21st-century American guitarists
American performers of Christian music
Christian music songwriters
Fair Trade Services artists
Guitarists from California
Musicians from San Diego
People from Vista, California
Performers of contemporary worship music